Forever, Lulu is a 1987 West German-American comedy-mystery film directed by Amos Kollek, and starring Hanna Schygulla, Deborah Harry, Wayne Knight and Alec Baldwin in his film debut. The film features sex therapist Ruth Westheimer. It was the final film starring Beatrice Pons and R. L. Ryan.

Plot 
The film centers on a German woman, Elaine Hines (Hanna Schygulla), living in New York City with aspirations of becoming a novelist. Reality settles in when Elaine loses her secretary job at a toilet seat company. Her agent calls her manuscript unsellable and not sexy enough before dropping her as a client.  As if life couldn't get more unbearable for Elaine, her unexpected blind date turns disastrous.  She runs out in the rain, waving a gun in the air in a mental breakdown.  A couple sees her in the rain, assuming she has some violent tendencies.  Afraid for their lives, they give Elaine their coats.  Inside one of the coats' pockets is a picture of a blonde woman (Deborah Harry) she previously encountered, signed "Forever, Lulu" and an address.  From this point, Elaine's life takes a crazy turn that involves gangsters, money, drugs, a handsome cop (Alec Baldwin) and the mystery blonde in the photograph.

Box office information 
According to Box Office Mojo, Forever, Lulu grossed $36,786 in its brief North American theatrical run.

Home media
RCA/Columbia Pictures Home Video released Forever, Lulu on VHS in late 1987. Sony Pictures Home Entertainment (successor to RCA/Columbia Pictures Home Video) officially released this on DVD in 2005.  It was released by other home entertainment distributors under the alternate title, Crazy Streets.  Some DVD copies portrayed either Alec Baldwin or Deborah Harry on the cover, even though they are featured in supporting roles.

References

External links

1987 films
1987 comedy films
1980s black comedy films
1980s comedy mystery films
West German films
American black comedy films
American comedy mystery films
1980s English-language films
English-language German films
Films directed by Amos Kollek
Films scored by Paul Chihara
Films set in New York City
Films shot in New York City
TriStar Pictures films
1980s American films